Age of Legends is a Chinese television series starring William Chan and Ma Sichun. It is based on the novel of the same name by Xiao Qi Xiao (骁骑校). The series started filming on August 3, 2017 at Beijing and finished in December 2017.  It was broadcast on Zhejiang TV and Dragon TV from September 17 to October 11, 2018.

Synopsis
Eight years ago, Liu Ziguang (William Chan) left Jiang Bei City after his father's death. He met Nie Wanfeng (Liu Yijun) and became "sworn" brothers with him. The two worked for an American crime boss named Colby, who locked Ziguang away for four years. However Ziguang trained himself and managed to escape, eventually being recruited by Wanfeng to join his syndicate after Colby's death. After learning of Wanfeng's true and malicious nature, Ziguang tipped the police off on a drug deal in international waters and escaped. However he hit his head in the waters and after being washed ashore back in China, he had no memory of what transpired in between his self-exile to present day. He then met policewoman Hu Rong (Ma Sichun), and two worked together to expose Wanfeng's crimes.

Cast

Soundtrack

Reception

Ratings 

 Highest ratings are marked in red, lowest ratings are marked in blue

Awards and nominations

References

External links
 Age of Legends on Weibo
 Age of Legends on Douban

 

Chinese crime television series
Chinese action television series
Television shows based on Chinese novels
2018 Chinese television series debuts
Zhejiang Television original programming
Television series by Croton Media
2018 Chinese television series endings